William George Hervey Jolliffe, 4th Baron Hylton (2 December 1898 – 14 November 1967), was a British peer and soldier.

Hylton was the son of Hylton Jolliffe, 3rd Baron Hylton, and Lady Alice Adeliza Hervey. He achieved the rank of Lieutenant-Colonel in the Coldstream Guards and also served as Lord Lieutenant of Somerset from 1949 to 1964. Lord Hylton married Lady Perdita Rose Mary Asquith, daughter of Katharine and Raymond Asquith, eldest son of Prime Minister H. H. Asquith, in 1931. He died in November 1967, aged 68.

He was succeeded in his titles by his elder son Raymond. The writer (of eg. Raymond Asquith: Life and Letters) John Hedworth Jolliffe is his younger son; his daughter Mary is the wife of John Paget Chancellor, son of Christopher Chancellor of Reuters. Mary and John Chancellor are the parents of the actress Anna Chancellor and the financial historian Edward Chancellor.

References

External links 
 

1898 births
1967 deaths
Barons in the Peerage of the United Kingdom
Coldstream Guards officers
William
Lord-Lieutenants of Somerset
Somerset County Cricket Club presidents
Eldest sons of British hereditary barons